Coleophora paradrymidis is a moth of the family Coleophoridae. It is found in Sweden, Ukraine, the Czech Republic and Austria.

The larvae possibly feed on the leaves of Thesium alpinum.

References

paradrymidis
Moths of Europe
Moths described in 1949